Azaleodes fuscipes is a moth of the family Palaephatidae. It is found in Australia in Queensland rainforests from Cooktown southwards, nearly to Townsville.

External links
Australian Faunal Directory
Image at CSIRO Entomology
Moths of Australia
A Guide to Australian Moths

Moths of Australia
Palaephatidae
Moths described in 1987